Colombatto is a surname. Notable people with the surname include:

Enrica Bianchi Colombatto (born 1942), Italian actress
Santiago Colombatto (born 1997), Argentine footballer